is a Japanese manga series written and illustrated by Tsukasa Hojo. The series was adapted into an anime series produced by Sunrise, directed by Kenji Kodama and broadcast by Yomiuri Television.

A total of 51 episodes aired from April 6, 1987 to March 28, 1988. "Ai yo Kienaide" by Kahoru Kohiruimaki was the opening theme for Episodes 1–26, while "Go Go Heaven" by Yoshiyuki Osawa was used for the remaining episodes. The ending theme for all 51 episodes was "Get Wild" by TM Network; "Get Wild" and a later 1989 remix sold a combined 515,010 singles in Japan.

The series was then released in Japan as ten VHS  tapes from December 1987 tp July 1988. A thirty-two disc DVD boxset City Hunter Complete published by Aniplex was released in Japan on August 31, 2005. The set contained all four series, the TV specials and animated movies as well as an art book and figures of Ryo and Kaori. The discs were then released individually, with the first series released on discs  from December 19, 2007 to February 27, 2008.

The series was licensed by ADV Films for release in North America. The first City Hunter series was released on the ADV Fansubs label in March 2000. The aim of this label was to provide cheaper subtitled only VHS releases at a faster pace than usual. The series was scheduled for 13 tapes, consisting of four episodes each. The tapes could be ordered individually or as a subscription service. ADV later released the series on DVD. The first series was released as two boxsets of five discs on July 29, 2003.

Episode list

References